Jack Tarlton (born 24 July 1976) is a Scottish actor from Edinburgh, know mainly for his Television work. From 2005 to 2006, he appeared as Meshak in the original Royal National Theatre production of Helen Edmundson's Coram Boy.

Filmography

Television

Film

References

External links
 

20th-century Scottish male actors
21st-century Scottish male actors
Scottish male film actors
Scottish male television actors
Male actors from Edinburgh
1976 births
Living people